The Ministry of Mining and Energy is the ministry in the Government of Serbia which is in the charge of mining and energy. The current minister is Dubravka Negre, in office since 26 October 2022.

History
The Ministry of Mining and Energy was established on 11 February 1991. The Ministry was abolished in 2011, when it was merged into Ministries of Infrastructure (Energy department) and Environment (Mining department). In 2012, it was reestablished as Energy department was split from the Infrastructure Ministry, and Environment department of reorganized former Environment Ministry was split. In 2014, the ministry in its original form with departments of Mining and Energy was established.

Subordinate institutions
There is agency that operate within the scope of the Ministry:
 Energy Resources Management Board

List of ministers
Political Party:

See also
 Minister of Natural Resources, Mining and Spatial Planning (Serbia)

References

External links
 Serbian Ministry of Energy, Development and Environmental Protection
 Serbia Energy Mining Market News
 Serbian ministries, etc – Rulers.org

Mining and Energy
1991 establishments in Serbia
Ministries established in 1991
Serbia
Serbia